Loney may refer to:

Loney (name)
The Loney, 2014 novel by Andrew Michael Hurley

See also

Looney (disambiguation)